Events during the year 1962 in Northern Ireland.

Incumbents
 Governor - 	The Lord Wakehurst 
 Prime Minister - Basil Brooke

Events
 26 February – The Irish Republican Army officially calls off its Border Campaign.
 1 April – Belfast Zoo (Bellevue Gardens) is transferred from Belfast Corporation's Transport Department to the Parks & Cemeteries Department to halt its further decline.
 31 May - The Northern Ireland general election again produces a large majority for the Ulster Unionist Party, winning 34 out of 51 seats, though the Nationalist Party gains two seats for a total of 9.
21 August – Former US President Dwight D. Eisenhower arrives in Belfast on a four-day visit to Ireland.
Ulster Hospital for Women and Sick Children is relocated from Belfast to Dundonald and renamed the Ulster Hospital.
 Denis Barritt and Charles Carter's The Northern Ireland Problem: a study in group relations is published by Oxford University Press.

Arts and literature
Belfast Festival at Queen's founded by student Michael Emmerson.
Belfast Municipal Museum and Art Gallery renamed as the Ulster Museum and recognised as a national museum. A major extension, designed in Brutalist style by Francis Pym, is begun.

Sport

Football
Irish League
Winners: Linfield

Irish Cup
Winners: Linfield 4 – 0 Portadown

Births
2 January – Niall Patterson, Antrim hurler.
22 January – Michael Alcorn, composer.
6 February – Tony Scullion, Derry GAA hurler and Gaelic footballer.
23 January – Letitia Gwynne, television presenter and journalist.
28 May – Andy White, singer-songwriter.
13 June – Colin Bateman, novelist and screenwriter.
16 June – Steve Aiken, Ulster Unionist leader.
3 July – Roy Beggs Jr, Ulster Unionist MLA.
6 July – Fearghal McKinney, television presenter and journalist.
19 July – Caitríona Ruane, Sinn Féin MLA and Minister for Education.
11 August – Paul McCrum, cricketer.
25 August – Vivian Campbell, rock guitarist.
28 October – Peter McDonald, poet and critic.
30 October – Colin Clarke, footballer and football manager.
7 December – Jeffrey Donaldson, Democratic Unionist Party MP for Lagan Valley.
Full date unknown – Anna Burns, novelist.

Deaths
Anne Acheson, sculptor (born 1882)

See also
1962 in Scotland
1962 in Wales

References

 
Northern Ireland